Yu Sang-hun (born 25 May 1989) is a South Korean footballer who plays as a goalkeeper for Gangwon FC.

Club career 
In 2011, he joined FC Seoul.

In the 2013 season, he became a second goalkeeper of FC Seoul.

In the 2014 season, he was selected as best player of 2014 AFC Champions League quarter-finals. 
Especially, in the Quarter-final 2nd leg, he saved three penalties in a shoot-out.

International career 
He was included in the South Korean national football team at the 2011 Summer Universiade

References

External links 
 

1989 births
Living people
Association football goalkeepers
South Korean footballers
FC Seoul players
Gimcheon Sangmu FC players
K League 1 players
Gangwon FC players
Sportspeople from Incheon